These are the squads for the countries that played in the 1949 South American Championship. The participating countries were Bolivia, Brazil, Chile, Colombia, Ecuador, Paraguay, Peru and Uruguay. Argentina withdrew from the tournament. The teams plays in a single round-robin tournament, earning two points for a win, one point for a draw, and zero points for a loss.

Bolivia
Head Coach:

Brazil
Head Coach:  Flavio Costa

Chile
Head Coach:  Luis Tirado

Colombia
Head Coach:  Friedrich Donnenfeld

Ecuador
Head Coach:  José Planas

Paraguay
Head Coach:  Manuel Fleitas Solich

Peru
Head Coach:  Arturo Fernández

Uruguay
Head Coach:  Oscar Marcenaro

References

Squads
Copa América squads